Cedric Ross Hayden is an American politician from Oregon. He currently serves in the Oregon State Senate from the 6th district, representing most of eastern Lane and Douglas counties. Hayden present served in the Oregon House of Representatives from District 7 from 2015 to 2023. His father, Cedric Lee Hayden, is a former state representative.

Hayden is a dentist, rancher, and businessman. He is a member of Fall Creek Adventist Church and founder of Caring Hands Worldwide, registered as a charity in the State of Oregon. He is a father of five. He lives with his family in Fall Creek.

External links
 Campaign website
 Legislative website

References

Living people
Republican Party members of the Oregon House of Representatives
People from Lane County, Oregon
American dentists
Businesspeople from Oregon
Ranchers from Oregon
21st-century American politicians
Year of birth missing (living people)